Deo vindice (Latin for "(With) God (as our) defender/protector") was the national motto of the Confederate States of America. It appears on the margin beneath the device of the Seal of the Confederate States. Never codified by law, Deo vindice was considered the de facto motto of the Confederate States from April 30, 1863, when the Confederate States Congress passed an act (Joint Resolution No. 4), establishing a Seal of the Confederate States. The national motto was first used publicly in 1864.

Notes

References

Deo vindice
Deo vindice
Deo vindice
Deo vindice
Deo vindice
Religion and politics